Amy is an unincorporated plains hamlet in Lane County, Kansas, United States, consisting presently of a large grain elevator and a house, and an abandoned school building.

History
A post office was opened in Amy in 1906, and remained in operation until it was discontinued in 1954.

Education
The community is served by Dighton USD 482 public school district.

References

Further reading

External links
 Lane County maps: Current, Historic, KDOT

Unincorporated communities in Lane County, Kansas
Unincorporated communities in Kansas